Demore Barnes (born February 26, 1976) is a Canadian actor. Barnes is best known for his roles as Sergeant First Class Hector Williams in the CBS television series The Unit, the archangel Raphael in Supernatural and Deputy Chief Christian Garland in Law & Order: Special Victims Unit.

Originally from Toronto, Barnes began his career with an appearance on the sketch comedy series Squawk Box on YTV. From there he joined the cast of Street Cents.

Filmography

Film

Television

Video games

References

External links
 

1976 births
Living people
Black Canadian male actors
Canadian male film actors
Canadian male television actors
Canadian male voice actors
Male actors from Toronto
Canadian people of Barbadian descent
20th-century Canadian male actors
21st-century Canadian male actors